Steve Clinkscale (born September 21, 1977) is an American football coach who is currently the co-defensive coordinator and defensive backs coach for the University of Michigan Wolverines football team.  He was previously the defensive backs coach for the University of Kentucky from 2016 to 2020.

Early years
Clinkscale was born in 1977. He grew up in Youngstown, Ohio, and attended Chaney High School. He attended Ashland University where he played football and was the team captain. He graduated in 2000 with a degree in sports science.

Coaching career
Clinkscale began his coaching career as the defensive backs coach at Ashland from 2001 to 2007. He then held the same position at Western Carolina in 2008. From 2009 to 2011, he was the cornerbacks coach and special teams coordinator at Toledo.  He next coached defensive backs at Cincinnati from 2013 to 2015. In January 2015, he was elevated to the defensive coordinator position at Cincinnati.

Clinkscale was hired in March 2016 as the defensive backs coach for the University of Kentucky Wildcats football team.  He held that position from 2016 to 2020. Kentucky's defensive backs under Clinkscale led the SEC in passing defense in 2019 and 2020.

Clinkscale was hired in May 2021 as Michigan's defensive backs coach. He was hired at an initial annual salary of $600,000. He also became co-defensive coordinator in 2022.

References

1977 births
Living people
Illinois Fighting Illini football coaches
Cincinnati Bearcats football coaches
Kentucky Wildcats football coaches
Michigan Wolverines football coaches
Sportspeople from Youngstown, Ohio
Coaches of American football from Ohio